Paskeh (also Romanized as Pāskeh; also known as Bālā Pāsgeh, Dasht-e Bījār, and Pāsgeh) is a village in Kasma Rural District, in the Central District of Sowme'eh Sara County, Gilan Province, Iran. At the 2006 census, its population was 488, in 144 families.

References 

Populated places in Sowme'eh Sara County